Cannock was a parliamentary constituency in Staffordshire which returned one Member of Parliament (MP)  to the House of Commons of the Parliament of the United Kingdom from 1918 until it was abolished for the 1983 general election. It was effectively recreated in 1997 as the seat of Cannock Chase.

Boundaries
1918–1955: The Urban Districts of Brownhills, Cannock, and Tettenhall, the Rural District of Seisdon, in the Rural District of Cannock the parishes of Bushbury, Cheslyn Hay, Essington, Great Wyrley, and Hilton, and in the Rural District of Walsall the parish of Bentley.

1955–1974: The Urban Districts of Cannock and Wednesfield, and the Rural District of Cannock.

1974–1983: The Urban Districts of Cannock and Rugeley, and the parish of Brindley Heath in the Rural District of Lichfield.

Members of Parliament

Election results

Election in the 1910s

 Parker was incorrectly designated as a coalition Liberal nominee in the official list of coalition candidates.

Elections in the 1920s

Elections in the 1930s

Elections in the 1940s

Elections in the 1950s

Elections in the 1960s

Elections in the 1970s

In an analysis of the voting trends at the 1970 general election, published shortly after the event, political scientist Richard Rose claimed that Jennie Lee's defeat in Cannock was "the biggest upset" of the contest. Rose believed that a large expansion in the electorate in the constituency contributed towards the 10.7% Labour to Conservative swing, which was significantly higher than the national average.

References 

Parliamentary constituencies in Staffordshire (historic)
Constituencies of the Parliament of the United Kingdom established in 1918
Constituencies of the Parliament of the United Kingdom disestablished in 1983
Cannock Chase